Vance Henry Trimble (July 6, 1913 – June 16, 2021) was an American journalist. He won a Pulitzer Prize for national reporting in recognition of his exposé of nepotism and payroll abuse in the U.S. Congress. Trimble worked in the newspaper business for over fifty years. He was inducted into the Oklahoma Journalism Hall of Fame in 1974. He published numerous books after his retirement.

Early life
Trimble was born in Harrison, Arkansas, on July 6, 1913. His father was a lawyer and his mother was the poet and writer Josie Crump Trimble. Trimble's father was the mayor of Harrison, and in 1919 a railroad strike on the Missouri and North Arkansas Railroad led to mob rule in the town. His father took the side against the mob rule and was essentially forced out of town. The family traveled to Okemah, Oklahoma, in 1920 to start a new life. Trimble and his family lived in Okemah until 1929 when they moved to Wewoka. Trimble graduated from Wewoka High School in 1931. In high school, Trimble was the editor of the school newspaper as well as a full-time reporter for the Wewoka Times Democratic as a courthouse reporter, sports editor, and city editor. At age eighteen, Trimble married Elzene Miller on January 9, 1932. The two met in high school when they both worked on the school newspaper. Elzene worked at a florist shop and Trimble lost his job a week after they wed, which led to their cross country travels in order to find employment.

Career
During the American Great Depression, Trimble worked wherever he could write. He maintained two to three newspaper jobs around the Seminole and Maud area, but only for a limited amount of time. Eventually, Trimble and his wife took to the road to find him a newspaper job. Along the way Trimble would repair typewriters, adding machines, and cash registers for money. After a year and a half, Trimble got jobs in Muskogee, Tulsa, and Okmulgee. The dailies he worked for include the Seminole Morning News, the Seminole Producer, the Okmulgee Times and the Muskogee Phoenix. Trimble also worked as financial editor of the Tulsa Tribune, and as editor of the Maud Enterprise. After being fired for joining the Newspaper Guild, Trimble went to work for the Beaumont Enterprise and the Port Arthur News in Texas.

In 1939, Trimble joined Scripps Howard as a copy editor for the Houston Press. Within six months, he was promoted to city editor. During World War II, he was assigned to the Army Signal Corps and served as editor of Camp Beale base's newspaper near Marysville, California, for two years. Thereafter, he and his family returned to Houston, "where he had a new home built on a small lot." He was appointed managing editor of the Press in 1950.

In 1955, Trimble was transferred to the Scripps Howard National Bureau in Washington, D.C. as night editor. He found this role to be duller than his previous job in Houston and decided to look for stories to investigate outside of his normal requirements. He came across a book by Raymond Clapper about nepotism in the United States Congress that had been published thirty years prior. After looking into current payrolls, he found that around twenty percent of Congress had family members on their payroll. Following its publication in the Washington Daily News, Trimble had a daily story for six months. As a result, then-Senate Majority Leader Lyndon Johnson decided to open up the payroll records of the U.S. Senate to bring them up to date.

As a result of his work, Trimble was awarded the 1960 Pulitzer Prize for National Reporting, the Sigma Delta Chi Distinguished Correspondence Record for Washington coverage, and the Raymond Clapper Award – referred to as the "triple crown". Trimble remained in Washington until 1963, when he was appointed editor of The Kentucky Post, a regional edition of The Cincinnati Post based in Covington, Kentucky. He drastically improved the paper during his time as editor. Two of his greatest mentors in the newspaper business were Walker Stone and Paul Miller. Trimble served at The Kentucky Post until 1979.

Retirement
Trimble constructed a monument to his wife after her death, dubbed the Oakwood Singing Tower, where she was buried in Wewoka. Though he had retired in Kentucky, Trimble moved back to Wewoka to be closer to his wife even in death. When asked the secret to a long life, Trimble responded, "stay in love." He published several books after leaving the newspaper business and even worked to have them available as e-books. Trimble and his wife donated $25,000 to the Wewoka Public Library for an expansion to hold approximately 5,000 books being donated from the couple's personal library.

Personal life
Trimble married Elzene Miller in 1932.  Together, they had one child, Carol Ann Nordheimer, who predeceased him in February 2021.  They remained married for 67 years until her death on July 5, 1999.

Trimble died on June 16, 2021, at his home in Wewoka, Oklahoma.  He was 107; the cause of death was not disclosed.

Published works
Along with being an award-winning journalist, Trimble published numerous books, including:
The Astonishing Mr. Scripps: The Turbulent Life of America's Penny Press Lord 
Heroes, Plain Folks, and Skunks: The Life and Times of Happy Chandler 
Sam Walton: The Inside Story of America's Richest Man 
The Uncertain Miracle: The History of Hyperbaric Medicine 
Ronald Reagan, the Man from Main Street, USA 
The Scripps Howard Handbook, 3rd rev. ed.
Faith in My Star: A Selection of His Own Words That Showcases the Vision and Vitality of E. W. Scripps
Overnight Success: Federal Express and Frederick Smith, Its Renegade Creator 
Alice & J.F.B.: The Hundred-Year Saga of Two Seminole Chiefs 
Bing Crosby: Love & Mystery
An Empire Undone: The Wild Rise and Hard Fall of Chris Whittle 
Choctaw Kisses, Bullets and Blood 
Poetry With My Love (ed.)
Will Rogers and His Daredevil Movie

References

External links
100 Year Life Oral History Project -- Oklahoma State University Library
Vance H. Trimble Manuscript Collection -- Ohio University Library

1913 births
2021 deaths
American newspaper reporters and correspondents
Pulitzer Prize winners
20th-century American non-fiction writers
People from Harrison, Arkansas
Military personnel from Arkansas
Writers from Arkansas
Pulitzer Prize for National Reporting winners
American centenarians
American biographers
United States Army personnel of World War II
Men centenarians